The Roller Hockey African Championship is the main roller hockey in Africa, organised by World Skate Africa and contested by the best African national teams.

The first edition was contested in 2019 and served as qualifier for the World Cup.

Results

References

Recurring sporting events established in 2019
Roller hockey competitions